Omar Ngandu (born 23 December 1996) is a Burundian football player. He plays in Rwanda for AS Kigali.

International
He made his Burundi national football team debut on 2 September 2018 in a friendly against Ethiopia.

He was selected for the squad for the 2019 Africa Cup of Nations.

References

External links
 
 

1996 births
Living people
Burundian footballers
Burundi international footballers
Association football defenders
APR F.C. players
AS Kigali FC players
Burundian expatriate footballers
Expatriate footballers in Rwanda
2019 Africa Cup of Nations players
Atlético Olympic FC players
21st-century Burundian people